Five ships of the French Navy have been named in honour of privateer and slave trader Robert Surcouf:

French ships named Surcouf 
  (1858), a sail and steam aviso
  (1889), a cruiser
  (1929), a submarine cruiser
  (1964), a 
  (1993), a

Bibliography 
 
 

French Navy ship names